Oliver Dudley Burden (March 15, 1873 – November 10, 1947) was an American lawyer from New York.

Life 
Burden was born on March 15, 1873, in Nelson, New York, the son of landowner James H. Burden and Lucia Groesbeck.

Burden attended Cazenovia High School and graduated from Cazenovia Academy in 1891. He then attended Cornell University and received a Bachelor of Philosophy and Bachelor of Law from the school. He graduated from Cornell Law School in 1896, and studied law under Judge Michael H. Kiley of Cazenovia. In 1898 he moved to Syracuse and began practicing law with M. E. and G. W. Driscoll. In 1899, he started practicing law with R. J. Shanahan. He was an active member of the Republican Party. He later practiced law with George R. Fearon. During World War I, he was chairman of Local Draft Board 469 in Syracuse.

In 1915, he was one of former President Theodore Roosevelt's attorneys during a libel law suit New York Republican state chairman William Barnes brought forward after Roosevelt called Barnes a corrupt leader. In 1923, President Warren G. Harding appointed him United States Attorney for the Northern District of New York. Calvin Coolidge and Herbert Hoover re-appointed him to the office, and he served until 1936. As United States Attorney, he was involved in a number of cases connected with enforcing Prohibition and income tax evasion.

Burden was a member of the American Bar Association, the New York State Bar Association, the Onondaga County Bar Association, the Commercial Law League, Delta Chi, the Sigma Tau fraternity, the Freemasons, the Shriners, the Knights of Pythias, and the Odd Fellows. In 1905, he married Irene de Tamble. His children were Mrs. S. R. Brentnall and Oliver D. Jr.

Burden died in Syracuse on November 10, 1947. He was buried in Evergreen Cemetery in Cazenovia.

References

External links 

 The Political Graveyard
 Oliver D. Burden at Find a Grave

1873 births
1947 deaths
People from Cazenovia, New York
Cornell Law School alumni
Lawyers from Syracuse, New York
19th-century American lawyers
20th-century American lawyers
New York (state) Republicans
United States Attorneys for the Northern District of New York
American Freemasons
Burials in New York (state)